The Mt. Pleasant Baptist Church near Keene, Kentucky is a historic church.

It began meeting in 1791 as part of the South Elkhorn Baptist Church community, was established as independent in 1801, with the current sanctuary being built in 1877 and added to the National Register in 1984.

It was deemed notable as "one of the few buildings remaining by the local builder A. M. Young", and as the best example of Romanesque Revival style among Jessamine County's rural churches.

References

Baptist churches in Kentucky
Churches on the National Register of Historic Places in Kentucky
Churches completed in 1877
19th-century Baptist churches in the United States
Churches in Jessamine County, Kentucky
National Register of Historic Places in Jessamine County, Kentucky
1791 establishments in Virginia
Romanesque Revival architecture in Kentucky
Pre-statehood history of Kentucky